Rooke is a surname, and may refer to:

 Daphne Rooke (1914–2009), South African author
 Sir Denis Rooke (1924–2008), English engineer
 Sir George Rooke (1650–1709), English admiral
 Hayman Rooke (1723–1806), English major and antiquary
 Irene Rooke (1878-1958), English actress
 Jessie Rooke (1845–1906), Australian women's rights campaigner
 Laurence Rooke (1622–1662), English astronomer
 Leon Rooke (born 1934), Canadian novelist
 Max Rooke (born 1981), Australian footballer
 Jordan (Pamela Rooke) (born 1955), English model and actress
 Ronnie Rooke (1911–1985), English footballer
 Steven Rooke, Australian actor
 Thomas Charles Byde Rooke (1806–1858), English physician who married into the royal family of the Kingdom of Hawaii 
 William Michael Rooke (1794–1847), Irish composer

See also
 Umboi Island